Cameroon's noncontentious, low-profile approach to foreign relations puts it squarely in the middle of other African and developing country states on major issues. It supports the principles of non-interference in the affairs of third world countries and increased assistance to underdeveloped countries. Cameroon is an active participant in the United Nations, where its voting record demonstrates its commitment to causes that include international peacekeeping, the rule of law, environmental protection, and Third World economic development. In the UN and other human rights fora, Cameroon's non-confrontational approach has generally led it to avoid criticizing other countries.

Cameroon enjoys good relations with the United States and other developed countries. Cameroon enjoys generally good relations with its African neighbors. It supports UN peacekeeping activities in Central Africa.

International disputes
Delimitation of international boundaries in the vicinity of Lake Chad, the lack of which led to border incidents in the past, is complete and awaits ratification by Cameroon, Chad, Niger, and Nigeria; dispute with Nigeria over land and maritime boundaries around the Bakasi Peninsula and Lake Chad is currently before the International Court of Justice (ICJ), as is a dispute with Equatorial Guinea over the exclusive maritime economic zone.  As of 10 October 2012, it has been resolved that Cameroon own Bakassi.

Cameroon also faces a complaint filed with the African Commission on Human Rights by the Southern Cameroons National Council (SCNC) and the Southern Cameroons Peoples Organisation (SCAPO) against the Government of the Republic of Cameroon, in which the complainants allege that the Republic of Cameroon is illegally occupying the territory of Southern Cameroons. The SCNC and SCAPO ultimately seek the independence of the territory of Southern Cameroons. As of 2008, both parties have submitted briefs and responded to the Human Rights Commissions' inquiries. A ruling by the African Commission on Human Rights is awaited.

Bilateral relationships

Multilateral relations
In addition to the United Nations, Cameroon is very active in other multilateral organisations or global institutions such as the Organisation internationale de la Francophonie, The Commonwealth, the Organisation of Islamic Cooperation, the Group of 77, the Non-Aligned Movement, the African Union and the Economic Community of Central African States.

Refugees and internally displaced persons
Refugees (country of origin): 20,000-30,000 (Chad); 3,000 (Nigeria); 24,000 (Central African Republic) (2007)

See also
 List of diplomatic missions in Cameroon
 List of diplomatic missions of Cameroon

References